UPS or ups may refer to:

Companies and organizations 
 United Parcel Service, an American shipping company
 The UPS Store, UPS subsidiary
 UPS Airlines, UPS subsidiary
 Underground Press Syndicate, later Alternative Press Syndicate or APS
 Union Philosophical Society
 Union Progressiste Sénégalaise, the former name of the Socialist Party of Senegal
 Universal Pantheist Society
 Université Paul Sabatier (Paul Sabatier University), Toulouse, France
 Universal Press Syndicate
 University of Puget Sound, Tacoma, Washington, United States
 United Photoplay Service, a Chinese film company in the 1930s

Science, technology, and medicine 
 Unpentseptium, an unsynthesized chemical element with atomic number 157 and symbol Ups
 Ubiquitin-proteasome system
 Ultraviolet photoelectron spectroscopy
 Uninterruptible power supply
 Universal Polar Stereographic coordinate system
 Ups (debugger)
 Universal Proteomics Standard mixture of proteins by sPRG of Association of Biomolecular Resource Facilities